Vladimir Raskatov (23 October 1957 – 11 January 2014) was a Ukrainian freestyle swimmer who competed in the 1976 Summer Olympics. He died in Chișinău.

References

1957 births
2014 deaths
Soviet male freestyle swimmers
Ukrainian male freestyle swimmers
Olympic swimmers of the Soviet Union
Swimmers at the 1976 Summer Olympics
Olympic silver medalists for the Soviet Union
Olympic bronze medalists for the Soviet Union
Olympic bronze medalists in swimming
European Aquatics Championships medalists in swimming
Medalists at the 1976 Summer Olympics
Olympic silver medalists in swimming